Atin Bandyopadhyay or Atin Banerjee (1934–2019) was an Indian writer of Bengali literature.

Early life
He was born in 1934 in a Rarhi Kulin Brahmin family from Sammandi, Bikrampur, Dhaka. He spent his childhood in a joint family set-up in the then East Bengal of undivided India and studied in Sonar Gaon Panam School. Following the Partition, he migrated to India. He earned his undergraduate degree in commerce in 1956 and subsequently earned a teacher's training degree, all from the University of Calcutta. He took various jobs, including; as a sailor, truck-cleaner and primary school teacher. Also he became headmaster of a senior basic school. He became the head master of Satui Rajendra Narayan High School which is situated near the Chowrigacha Railway Station in the Murshidabad district.  Bandyopadhyay settled permanently in Kolkata in 1986. Here also he took on various jobs like factory manager, publication advisor and lastly journalist.

Career as a writer
Bandyopadhyay's first story was published in the magazine Abasar of Berhampore. He later penned many works, but, his masterpiece is considered to be a four-part tetralogy on the Partition; Nilkantha Pakhir Khonje,"Manusher Gharbari" Aloukik Jalajan and Ishwarer Bagan. Another famous writer of Bengal, Syed Mustafa Siraj has compared Nilkantha Pakhir Khonje, with Greek tragedies and also found it tuned with the core spirit of Bengali literature like Bibhutibhushan Bandyopadhyay's Pather Panchali.

Selected works

Works for younger audience
Uronto Torobari (Ananda Pub)
Gini Rohosyo (Ananda Pub)
Binnir Khoi Lal Batasa (Ananda Pub)
Dosti Kishore Uponyas (Ananda Pub)
Paloker Tupi(Punascha)
Neel Timi(Karuna Prakashoni)
Fentur Sada Ghora(Karuna Prakashoni)

Dosti Kishore Uponyas
Fentur Sada Ghora
Rajar Bari
Binnir Khoi Lal Batasa
Aronyorajye Mandela
Neel Timi
Uronto Torobari
Hirer Cheyeo Dami
Ekti joler rekha o Ora teen jon
Gini Rohosyo
Dustu Hititi

References

 Writers from Kolkata

External links
 Library of Congress profile at The South Asian Literary Recordings Project, Library of Congress; New Delhi Office, India
 Bengali Books Online profile
 Atin Bandyopadhyay at the West Bengal Public Library Network

1934 births
2019 deaths
Bengali writers
Bengali novelists
Bengali-language writers
Recipients of the Sahitya Akademi Award in Bengali
University of Calcutta alumni
Writers from Dhaka
Indian male novelists
Deaths from cerebrovascular disease
Writers from West Bengal